Plymouth Municipal Airport  is a public use airport located two nautical miles (4 km) north of the central business district of Plymouth, a city in Marshall County, Indiana, United States. It is owned by the Plymouth Board of Aviation of Commissioners. This airport is included in the National Plan of Integrated Airport Systems for 2011–2015, which categorized it as a general aviation facility.

Facilities and aircraft 
Plymouth Municipal Airport covers an area of 192 acres (78 ha) at an elevation of 800 feet (244 m) above mean sea level. It has one runway designated 10/28 with an asphalt surface measuring 4,400 by 60 feet (1,341 x 18 m).

For the 12-month period ending December 31, 2009, the airport had 5,830 aircraft operations, an average of 15 per day: 80% general aviation and 20% air taxi. At that time there were 16 aircraft based at this airport: 94% single-engine and 6% jet.

References

External links 
 Airport page at City of Plymouth website
 
 Aerial image as of April 1998 from USGS The National Map
 
 

Airports in Indiana
Transportation in Marshall County, Indiana
Buildings and structures in Marshall County, Indiana